Gunda engonata is a species of moth from the Bombycidae family. It was described by Charles Swinhoe in 1899. It is found in India.

The larvae have been recorded feeding on Ficus species.

References

External links
 Clenora engonata at Encyclopedia of Life

Moths described in 1899
Bombycidae